"I'm Still Waitin'" is the debut single recorded by German singer Sasha, featuring rapper Young Deenay. It was written by Sasha along with Grant Michael B. and Pomez di Lorenzo for Sasha's debut studio album Dedicated to... (1998), while production was helmed by the latter two. Their third consecutive collaboration following "Walk on By" and "Wanna Be Your Lover", it was their first song to feature Deenay as the guest vocalist. Warner Music released the reggae-influenced mid-tempo song as the lead single from Dedicated to... on 22 June 1998. It became a top 20 success in Austria, Germany and Switzerland.

Formats and track listings

Credits and personnel 
Credits adapted from the liner notes of Dedicated to...

Music and lyrics – Pomez di Lorenzo, Grant Michael B.
Lead and backing vocals – Sasha
Rap – Young Deenay
Mixing – Falk Moller, Michael B.

Charts

Weekly charts

Year-end charts

References

External links
 Sasha.de — official website

1998 debut singles
1998 songs
Sasha (German singer) songs
Warner Music Group singles